Boombastic Hits is the second compilation album released by Jamaican singer Shaggy. The album was released on November 6, 2003. The album features a range of material from Shaggy's albums "Boombastic" and "Midnite Lover", as well as the b-side "One Burner", which had previously never been included on any of Shaggy's albums.

Track listing
 "Boombastic" - 4:09 (From 'Boombastic')
 "Piece of My Heart" (featuring Marsha) - 4:18 (From 'Midnite Lover')
 "Something Different" (featuring Wayne Wonder) - 4:31 (From 'Boombastic')
 "Perfect Song" (featuring Maxi Priest) - 3:43 (From 'Midnite Lover')
 "One Burner" - 3:52 (B-Side to 'Piece of My Heart')
 "Heartbreak Suzie" (featuring Gold Mine) - 4:09 (From 'Boombastic')
 "My Dream" - 3:23 (From 'Midnite Lover')
 "Geenie" (featuring Brian and Tony Gold) - 4:00 (From 'Midnite Lover')
 "Forgive Them Father" - 3:28 (From 'Boombastic')
 "Midnite Lover" - 3:44 (From 'Midnite Lover')
 "Gal You a Pepper" - 4:18 (From 'Boombastic')
 "In the Summertime" (Sting vs. Shaggy Remix) - 3:47 (From 'Boombastic')

Shaggy (musician) albums
2003 greatest hits albums